Autonet Group, established in 1996 in Satu Mare, is one of the largest auto parts distributor in Hungary and Romania and claims to have an annual delivery of seven million spare parts to 9,000 customers in the two countries.

References

External links
Official site

Automotive companies of Romania
Companies based in Satu Mare